Canara College was started in 1973 by the C.H.S. Association, which has managed educational institutions since 1891. It is affiliated with Mangalore University. 

The college provides three years degree courses in Arts, Science, Commerce and Computers to men and women. Over 27 years, they gained 86 ranks in the University Examination, including 10 first ranks.

Objective
It is the college's goal to provide a sound education while also fostering good character traits, patriotism and modern sensibilities. Extracurricular activities to also prepare students includes:  National Service Scheme, Arts Association, Commerce Association, Science Association, Literary Association, Fine Arts Association, Amateur Speaker's Club, Games and Sports Association, Ladies Association, and blood donation.

Every year the university hosts 4 inter-collegiate events:
Canfest: A National level Inter-Collegiate Commerce meet in which nearly 300 students from 20 colleges participate.
Scientica: Started in 2005, is a State level Inter-Collegiate Science and IT meet in which about 20 Colleges participate.
Maanaveeya: A university level Inter-Collegiate Arts Meet conducted for the colleges of mangalore university in which about 15 colleges take part every year.
Srujana: A University level NSS meet for the students of NSS from various colleges under mangalore university. About 15 Colleges take part each year.
Cancup: Inter-Collegiate Volleyball Tournament at the University Level in which 25 teams from 20 colleges participate.

There are a number of scholarships for deserving students, Mid-day Meal Scheme and a number of endowment prizes for academic achievements. The Parents-Teachers Association and Alumni Association provide support for the college library and other improvement programs.

Canara Pre-University College
Canara Pre-University College was founded in 1972.  The institution provides education for both boys and girls. The institution is managed by Canara High School Association.  The college aims to provide a solid education and foster strong character traits. 

The college offers scholarships to eligible students. 

Students are encouraged to participate in sports, games and other activities.

See also
 Ammembal Subba Rao Pai - founder of Canara High School

References

External links
 Canara College History
 CHS Association

Universities and colleges in Mangalore
Colleges of Mangalore University
1973 establishments in Karnataka
Educational institutions established in 1973